Tillandsia brenneri is a species of plant in the family Bromeliaceae. It is endemic to Ecuador.  Its natural habitats are subtropical or tropical moist lowland forests and subtropical or tropical moist montane forests. It is threatened by habitat loss.

References

External links

Flora of Ecuador
brenneri
Vulnerable plants
Taxonomy articles created by Polbot